William A. Jones may refer to:

William A. Jones (politician), member of the Wisconsin State Assembly
William Atkinson Jones (1849–1918), member of the U.S. House of Representatives
William Augustus Jones Jr. (1934–2006), African-American minister and civil rights leader
Dub Jones (American football) (William Augustus Jones, born 1924), former American footballer
William Jones (bishop of Puerto Rico) (William Ambrose Jones, 1865–1921), bishop of Puerto Rico, 1907–1921
William A. Jones (bishop of Missouri) (William Augustus Jones Jr., 1927–2020) 
William A. Jones III (1922–1969), US Air Force officer and Medal of Honor recipient 
William A. Jones (writer), British author of MindWealth: building Personal Wealth from Intellectual Property Right

See also
William Jones (disambiguation)